Norm Stott (21 March 1904 – 3 August 1994) was an Australian rules footballer who played with Fitzroy in the Victorian Football League (VFL).

Notes

External links 
		

1904 births
1994 deaths
Australian rules footballers from Victoria (Australia)
Fitzroy Football Club players